Kamukunji Constituency is an electoral constituency in Kenya. It is one of seventeen constituencies of Nairobi County. It consists of central to eastern areas of Nairobi. Kamukunji constituency had common boundaries with Pumwani Division of Nairobi. The entire constituency is located within Nairobi City County area. The constituency forms part of what was known as Nairobi Central Constituency at the 1963 elections. Kamukunji Constituency was conceived prior to the 1969 elections. The current constituency boundaries were revised prior to the 2013 elections. It borders Starehe Constituency to the west, Makadara to the south, Embakasi West Constituency to the east, and Mathare Constituency to the north.

Prominent politician Tom Mboya was the first MP from this constituency. He was assassinated in 1969.

Members of Parliament

Wards 
After the promulgation of the 2010 constitution and the implementation of devolution, the 2013 elections had Kamukunji constituency boundaries were revised, reducing number of wards to five, while creating new ones, namely; California, Eastleigh North, Eastleigh South, Airbase and Pumwani wards.

 Prior to 2013

 Prior to 2013

Kamukunji Sub-county
The Sub-county shares the same boundaries with what was the Pumwani Division; the division had common boundaries with Kamukunji Constituency prior to 2013. The Sub-county is headed by the sub-county administrator, appointed by a County Public Service Board.

References

External links 
Map of the constituency
Uchaguzikenya.com – Constituency profile

Constituencies in Nairobi